Flaming Creatures is a 1963 American experimental film directed by Jack Smith. The film shows performers dressed in elaborate drag for several disconnected scenes, including a lipstick commercial, an orgy, and an earthquake. It premiered April 29, 1963 at the Bleecker Street Cinema in New York City.

Because of its graphic depiction of sexuality, some venues refused to show Flaming Creatures, and in March 1964, police interrupted a screening and seized a print of the film. Jonas Mekas, Ken Jacobs, and Florence Karpf were charged, and the film was ruled to be in violation of New York's obscenity laws. Mekas and Susan Sontag mounted a critical defense of Flaming Creatures, and it became a cause célèbre for the underground film movement.

Plot
Most of the film's characters are sexually ambiguous, including transvestites, intersex, and drag performers. Flaming Creatures is largely non-narrative, and its action is often interrupted by cutaways to close-ups of body parts.

The film opens with credit sequence set to the soundtrack of Ali Baba and the Forty Thieves and the announcement that "Ali Baba comes today!". Two creatures laze in a garden and dance. In what Smith called the "smirching sequence", characters apply lipstick while a mock advertisement poses the question, "Is there lipstick that doesn't come off when you suck cocks?" Two creatures chase each other, and one throws the other to the ground. Several creatures gather around her in a rape scene, which grows into a large orgy. The earth begins to quake, and the creatures collapse. A vampire resembling Marilyn Monroe climbs out of a coffin and drains some of the lifeless creatures. This reignites the action, and the creatures rise again to dance with one another.

Production
Smith shared an apartment with artist Marian Zazeela for a period in the early 1960s. He published The Beautiful Book, a series of photographs with Zazeela that began to develop the aesthetic of Flaming Creatures. Smith conceived the film as a vehicle for Zazeela. However, she began working with composer La Monte Young and was unable to participate in Smith's project. After she moved out, he became roommates with Tony Conrad and replaced Zazeela with Sheila Bick. He filmed Flaming Creatures in mid to late 1962. He held shoots during weekends on the roof of the Windsor Theatre, at 412 Grand Street in the Bronx. Dick Preston offered his loft above the theatre for use as a prop department and dressing room. Smith had observed the effects of using out-of-date film working on Ken Jacobs' Star Spangled to Death and decided to use the technique after seeing Ron Rice's The Flower Thief. He used stolen Army surplus Kodak Plus-X reversal film. The reels were out-of-date, giving parts of the film a foggy or high-contrast texture.

The film's working title was Pasty Thighs and Moldy Midriffs; Smith also considered using Flaking Moldy Almond Petals, Moldy Rapture, or Horora Femina. Smith made Flaming Creatures as a way to film "all the funniest stuff he could think of" and depict "different ideas of glamour." He produced the film on a very low budget of $300.

Smith shared an apartment with Tony Conrad, who produced the film's soundtrack. The two lived in a building on the Lower East Side, where Angus MacLise lived and René Rivera (later known as Mario Montez) moved. They held informal group sessions during the evening which Conrad recorded. The soundtrack incorporates "Siboney" by Ernesto Lecuona, "Amapola" by Joseph Lacalle, and various pasodobles. Smith began screening unfinished versions of Flaming Creatures to friends. Piero Heliczer held a benefit for the film at painter Jerry Joffen's loft. Mekas discussed a private screening of the film through his column in The Village Voice, and Conrad produced a second version of the soundtrack for the film's theatrical premiere.

Release history

Early screenings
Flaming Creatures premiered April 29, 1963 as part of a double feature with Blonde Cobra at the Bleecker Street Cinema in Manhattan, New York. Later screenings were held at the Gramercy Theatre. Because the film had not been submitted for licensing, the shows were free and audiences were asked to donate to the "Love and Kisses for Censors Film Society". Film Culture voted in December 1963 to award Smith its Independent Film Award for the film. It rented the Tivoli Theatre, known for showing sexploitation films, and planned a screening of Flaming Creatures, excerpts from Smith's Normal Love, and Andy Warhol's Newsreel. The theatre canceled the event due to the obscene content in Flaming Creatures. Several hundred people gathered at the theatre, and Smith was given his award in an impromptu ceremony. A crowd of several hundred people led by Barbara Rubin occupied the Tivoli until police could clear the building.

At the third Knokke Experimental Film Festival, the selection committee rejected Flaming Creatures out of concern that it fell afoul of Belgium's obscenity laws. In protest, Mekas resigned from the festival jury, and several American filmmakers threatened to withdraw their films. Mekas smuggled in the film in a canister for Stan Brakhage's Dog Star Man and held continuous private screenings out of his hotel. On New Year's Eve, Mekas, Rubin, and P. Adams Sitney forced their way into a projection booth and screened a portion of the film.

Obscenity trial and censorship

In February 1964, the Film-Makers' Cinematheque successfully showed the films from the Tivoli program at the New Bowery Theater, as a program titled "Our Infamous Surprise Program". During the program's third showing on March 3, police stopped the event while Flaming Creatures was being screened. They arrested Mekas, Ken Jacobs, Florence Karpf, and Jerry Sims and seized the film reels and projection equipment. The police department did not return the only print of Warhol's film, about the making of Normal Love, and it is now considered lost. Mekas held a benefit screening of Un chant d'amour to raise money for a legal defense fund but was arrested again.

Civil rights lawyer Emile Zola Berman accepted the case, believing it would potentially reach the U.S. Supreme Court. Sims, who had been taking tickets, managed to avoid prosecution by claiming he had not seen what was on the screen. People of the State of New York v. Kenneth Jacobs, Florence Karpf and Jonas Mekas was heard on June 12, 1964. As part of the defense, expert testimony came from filmmaker Shirley Clarke, poet Allen Ginsberg, writer Susan Sontag, filmmaker Willard Van Dyke and film historian Herman G. Weinberger. The defendants were convicted but given suspended sentences. They appealed on the grounds that the trial had excluded the expert testimony provided. The New York Supreme Court heard the appeal and reversed the convictions. It stated in its opinion that "whatever view this Court might hold as to the obscenity of 'Flaming Creatures,' it is manifest that the appellants herein believe in good faith that the film is not obscene." Fifty years later, the prosecutor for the case issued an apology to Mekas, writing, "Although my appreciation of free expression and aversion to censorship developed more fully as I matured, I should have sooner acted more courageously."

In April 1965, an off-campus screening by students of the University of New Mexico was raided by police, who seized the print. In November 1966, a screening by the UT Austin chapter of Students for a Democratic Society was broken up. A January 1967 screening at the University of Michigan resulted in the confiscation of the film and the arrest of four students, triggering protests and a sit-in by students. A screening at the University of Notre Dame at its Pornography and Censorship Conference in 1969 was canceled. When students attempted to screen prohibited films, police interrupted the event, leading to the school's first known violent conflict between police and students.

Later history
Smith and Mekas fell out, with Smith accusing Mekas of stealing the original Flaming Creatures print on behalf of Anthology Film Archives. Smith was opposed to giving his works a fixed form, preferring to continue re-editing his films. The print was lost until 1978, when Jerry Tartaglia found it in a discarded pile of scrap and returned it to Smith.

It was not until after Smith's death in 1989 that larger institutions started to screen Flaming Creatures. Critic J. Hoberman and performer Penny Arcade saved Smith's belongings and had a restoration of the film made, a project which took five years. The New York Film Festival showed the film in 1991, and the Museum of the Moving Image included it in a 1997 retrospective of Smith's work.

Senate use and effect on Fortas' Supreme Court nomination
In 1968, Abe Fortas was nominated to be Chief Justice of the United States. Fortas had supported reversing the original convictions for screening Flaming Creatures, so Senator James Eastland, chairman of the Senate Judiciary Committee, requested that the print seized at the University of Michigan be sent to Washington. James Clancy, representing Citizens for Decent Literature, showed the film among other material, inviting senators to view what Fortas had held in several decisions did not constitute obscenity. Nixon adviser Pat Buchanan credited the effort with ruining Fortas' nomination.

Reception and legacy
Ken Kelman described Flaming Creatures as a Miltonian "ancient ritual chant…not for the Paradise Lost, but for the Hell Satan gained." Arthur Knight called the film a "faggoty stag-reel ... defiling at once both sex and cinema." Pete Hamill described it as "a sophomoric exercise in the kind of sex that Henry Miller dealt with 30 years ago."

Following the seizure of the film, the director of the Homosexual League of New York called Flaming Creatures "long, disturbing and psychologically unpleasant". Amos Vogel likened it to a film noir that "despite flashes of brilliance and moments of perverse, tortured beauty" was full of "limp genitalia and limp art." Susan Sontag praised the film in a 1966 essay as a "rare modern work of art: it is about joy and innocence." P. Adams Sitney described Flaming Creatures as "a myth of recovered innocence" in which Smith "utterly transforms his sources and uncovers a mythic center from which they had been closed off." Jonathan Rosenbaum called the film "one of the greatest and most pleasurable avant-garde movies ever made". Anthology Film Archives included the film in its Essential Cinema Repertory collection. According to The Village Voice Film Guide, Gregory Markopoulos "was only slightly exaggerating when he commented that ... early audiences were astounded when their secret Hollywood fantasies burst upon the screen". It is listed in the film reference book 1001 Movies You Must See Before You Die, which says "The film's distinctive beauty is due largely to Smith's nimble use of the handheld camera. His unexpected framings yield dense images of fabrics, body parts, and heavily made-up faces."

Having never seen the original film, video artist Bec Stupak created a "remake" of Flaming Creatures in 2006 based only on descriptions of the film. Todd Haynes alludes to the film with a fictional band named the Flaming Creatures in his 1998 feature Velvet Goldmine. Guy Maddin's 2009 film The Little White Cloud That Cried was conceived as a tribute to Flaming Creatures.

Notes

See also
Blonde Cobra
 Ken Jacobs
 Jonas Mekas

References

External links

Flaming Creatures by Constantine Verevis
Flaming Creatures on MUBI

1960s avant-garde and experimental films
1963 LGBT-related films
1963 films
American black-and-white films
American erotic films
American LGBT-related films
Censored films
Drag (clothing)-related films
Film censorship in the United States
Film controversies in the United States
Films directed by Jack Smith
LGBT-related controversies in film
LGBT-related controversies in the United States
Obscenity controversies in film
Sexual-related controversies in film
1960s English-language films
1960s American films